Karahöyük is a village in the İncesu, Kayseri, Turkey.

References

Villages in Kayseri Province
İncesu district